Zeeteah Silveta Massiah (born December 24, 1956) is a Barbadian-born British singer particularly associated with reggae, jazz and house music.

In a wide-ranging career she has recorded and/or toured with artists including Robbie Williams, Tom Jones, Michael Jackson, Phil Collins, Sting, Leo Sayer, and Michael Bolton. She is best known in the United States as the lead vocalist on the 1993 Billboard No.1 dance hit "Slide on the Rhythm".

Massiah was born in Saint John, Barbados and grew up in London. In 2001 she moved to Germany, and in 2012 returned to England, where she now lives.

Biography
Born in Barbados, Zeeteah moved to London with her parents when she was five years old. Her first name was originally spelled Zeitia. As a teenager she recorded a cover of The Jackson 5's We Got A Good Thing Going in a reggae style for Trojan Records. She went on to record two more reggae tracks for the label.

In 1984, Massiah appeared for nine months as Chiffon in the hit musical Little Shop of Horrors in London.

She has been an additional vocalist for artists including Barry Manilow and Boy George, and toured with Michael Bolton, Climie Fisher and Paul Weller. In 1988, she sang with Kim Wilde on the European leg of Michael Jackson's BAD tour and, in 1994/95, toured the world with Tom Jones. She has also toured extensively with Eikichi Yazawa and Johnny Hallyday, among the most successful rock stars in Japan and France respectively.

In 1993, Massiah was the lead vocalist on the Arizona track "Slide on the Rhythm", later remixed by C&C Music Factory, which was a No. 1 hit on the Billboard Dance Chart in the US. She went on to record "I Specialise in Love" with Arizona, which was a UK chart hit.

On the back of her success with Arizona, Massiah signed a deal with Virgin Records, and released two singles: "Sexual Prime", which was a UK club hit, and "This Is The Place", which charted on the UK Singles Chart. In 1996 she was a UK finalist in the Eurovision Song Contest with "A Little Love".

In 2001, Massiah moved to Cologne, Germany, where she worked with a wide range of musicians, and recorded the single "Lovely Deep". During this time she spent nine months as featured singer in the hit show Fantissima, and spent three months touring Japan with Eikichi Yazawa.

In 2012, she returned to London to be with her partner Paul Caplin, and the two were married in 2016. Massiah performs regularly in London, playing songs composed by Caplin as well as her own interpretations of musical classics. She has released two albums produced by Caplin: Juice (2014), an album of original songs, and Maybe Tomorrow (2016), a collection of classics. The duo also released the single “All You” on 13 July 2018 under the name Caplin & Massiah.

On 4 February 2022 Massiah released “Wat A Ting”, the first single from her forthcoming album Zeet’s Beats.

Discography

Singles
1980 "We Got A Good Thing Going"
1980 "A Love Like Yours"
1981 "I'm Still Waiting"
1991 "(Homegirl) Sing The Blues"
1992 "Feel My Love" 
1993 "Slide on the Rhythm" – Arizona feat. Zeitia
1994 "This Is The Place"
1994 "Keep It Up" – Sharada House Gang feat. Zeitia Massiah
1994 "I Specialize in Love" – Arizona feat. Zeitia
1996 "Sweet Love" – With It Guys feat. Zeitia
1996 "Sexual Prime"
1997 "You Got It" – Fargetta feat. Zeitia Massiah (five tracks on album)
1997 "Beat of Green" – Fargetta feat. Zeitia Massiah
1998 "Wishing on a Star" – Curtis & Moore presenting Zeitia Massiah (remixed by Mousse T)
1998 "Wishing on a Star Part 2" – Curtis & Moore presenting Zeitia Massiah
1998 "Baby Come Back" – North on 41 feat. Zeitia Massiah
1998 "You Came" – North on 41 feat. Zeitia Massiah
2005 "Lovely Deep"
2014 "Whatever This Is"
2022 "Wat A Ting"

Albums
2013 Live in London
2014 Juice
2016 Maybe Tomorrow

Guest vocals

Singles
1989 "Keep Each Other Warm" – Barry Manilow
1989 "Strong Enough" – One Nation
1989 "What You See" – One Nation
1989 "My Commitment" – One Nation
1990 "Sweet Meat" – The Soup Dragons
1990 "Close to You" – Maxi Priest
1991 "Born Free" – Vic Reeves
1994 "Generations of Love" – Boy George
1994 "Rock My Heart" – Haddaway
1995 "Let's Push It" – Nightcrawlers
1995 "Should I Ever" – Nightcrawlers
1995 "You Lift Me Up" – Nightcrawlers
1996 "Born Free" – Happy Clappers
1996 "Maria" – Eikichi Yazawa
1996 "Naked" – Louise

Albums
1989 Trouble in the Home – Thrashing Doves
1991 Abracadabra – ABC
1993 Parc des Princes – Johnny Hallyday
1996 Smashing! – Right Said Fred
1999 Absolute O'Brien – Richard O'Brien
2021 Evolve – Gūnther Asbek

See also
List of number-one dance hits (United States)
List of artists who reached number one on the US Dance chart

References

External links
  Official Zeeteah Massiah website

1956 births
Living people
English women singers
Singers from London
Barbadian emigrants to England
People from Saint John, Barbados